At least two destructive tornadoes struck Myrtle Beach, South Carolina on Friday, July 6, 2001. The strongest of the two was a slow-moving F2 tornado that was caught on camera moving down the beach, injuring 39. In all, the tornadoes caused $8.8 million in damage.

Confirmed tornadoes

July 6 event

Other possible tornadoes
Near southern Myrtle Beach, evidence was found for three other damage paths that were estimated to have F0 and F1 strength. These tornadoes caused roof and tree damage. However, they were not added to the official database.

Aftermath
The storm that produced these tornadoes occurred during the Fourth of July weekend as an estimated 400,000 vacationers were at Myrtle Beach. Damage from the tornadoes is estimated to be up to $8,000,000 - with an estimated $1,000,000 damages associated with vehicles. 4,000 residents were without power during the worst parts of the storm.

See also
 List of North American tornadoes and tornado outbreaks

Notes

References

Myrtle Beach, South Carolina
Tornadoes in South Carolina
F2 tornadoes
Tornadoes of 2001